Barrow and Furness, formerly known as Barrow-in-Furness, is a constituency in Cumbria which has been represented in the House of Commons of the UK Parliament by Simon Fell of the Conservative Party since 2019.

History and profile
The seat of was established by the Redistribution of Seats Act 1885 and covers the southwest part of Cumbria. The largest town in the constituency, Barrow-in-Furness, grew on the back of the shipbuilding industry and is now the site of the BAE Systems nuclear submarine and shipbuilding operation. This reliance on the industry aligns many of its columnists and in its community with strong nuclear deterrents, from which Labour has recoiled since its involvement in the Iraq War that removed dictator Saddam Hussain. Labour Cabinet member Albert Booth represented Barrow from 1966 for many years but was defeated in 1983, in the aftermath of the Falklands War, by a Manchester lawyer, Cecil Franks of the Conservative Party, who retained the seat until 1992. Local media attributed this to widespread fears of job losses because the Labour Party was then signed up to doing away with all its nuclear capabilities including the submarines.

As Labour revised its policies by favouring the retention of Britain's nuclear capability, and following massive job losses in the town's shipbuilding industry, Labour's fortunes revived in Barrow. John Hutton took the seat back for Labour in 1992 and retained it until the 2010 general election, when he was replaced by John Woodcock, also of Labour. In 2001, Hutton had the support of more than half of all those who voted. Other industries in the constituency currently include engineering and chemicals, and more than a quarter of all jobs are in manufacturing. The 2015 result gave the seat the 10th-smallest majority of Labour's 232 seats by percentage of majority. In 2017, Woodcock's majority was reduced from 795 votes to 209 votes, the 16th smallest majority in the country. Conservative, Simon Fell, took the seat in 2019 with a slightly greater margin than John Woodcock had when he first won the seat for Labour in 2010.

Boundaries

This constituency contains the southern half of the Furness peninsula, South Cumbria in the north-west of England.

1885–1918: The municipal borough of Barrow-in-Furness.

1983–2010: The entire district of Barrow-in-Furness and the following wards from the District of South Lakeland: Low Furness, Pennington, Ulverston Central, Ulverston East, Ulverston North, Ulverston South and Ulverston West.

2010–present: The entire district of Barrow-in-Furness and the following wards from the District of South Lakeland: Broughton, Crake Valley, Low Furness & Swarthmoor, Ulverston Central, Ulverston East, Ulverston North, Ulverston South, Ulverston Town and Ulverston West.

Members of Parliament

Election results

Elections in the 19th century

Elections in the 1880s 

The election was declared void on petition, causing a by-election.

Elections in the 1890s

Elections in the 20th century

Elections in the 1900s

Elections in the 1910s 

General Election 1914–15:

Another General Election was required to take place before the end of 1915. The political parties had been making preparations for an election to take place and by July 1914, the following candidates had been selected;
Labour: Charles Duncan
Unionist: Francis Meynell

Elections in the 1920s

Elections in the 1930s 

General Election 1939–40

Another General Election was required to take place before the end of 1940. The political parties had been making preparations for an election to take place and by the Autumn of 1939, the following candidates had been selected; 
Conservative: Jonah Walker-Smith
Labour: Ronald McKinnon Wood

Elections in the 1940s

Elections in the 1950s

Elections in the 1960s

Elections in the 1970s

Elections in the 1980s

Elections in the 1990s

Elections in the 21st century

Elections in the 2000s

Elections in the 2010s

See also 

 List of parliamentary constituencies in Cumbria

Notes

References

Parliamentary constituencies in North West England
Constituencies of the Parliament of the United Kingdom established in 1885
Politics of Cumbria
Furness
Politics of Barrow-in-Furness